"Wanna See U Dance (La La La)" is a song by American singer Kat DeLuna. It was released on August 23, 2012, as the lead single of DeLuna's compilation album Loading (2016). The song contains a sample of "Tombo in 7/4" by Brazilian singer Airto Moreira.
The song was re-released on May 5, 2014 under the title "Wanna See U Dance 2014"  exclusively to the Japanese market.

Music video
The music video for "Wanna See U Dance (La La La)" premiered on August 24, 2012, on DeLuna's Vevo channel. It was directed by Haitian-born model Tyrone Edmond.

Track listing
Digital download
"Wanna See U Dance (La La La)" – 3:07

Japan re-release edition
"Wanna See U Dance 2014" (DJ FUMI★YEAH! version) – 5:12
"Wanna See U Dance 2014" (Kronic version) – 4:05
"Wanna See U Dance 2014" (DJ Ryo version) – 5:43
"Wanna See U Dance (La La La)" (original version) – 3:10

Chart performance

References

Kat DeLuna songs
2012 songs
Songs written by Kat DeLuna